Dolichocephala tali is a species of dance flies, in the fly family Empididae.

References

Diptera of Africa
Empididae
Insects described in 1940